Dorcas Ajoke Adesokan (born 5 July 1998) is a Nigerian badminton player.

Career 
In 2014, she won bronze medals at the African Championships in the women's singles and mixed doubles event, and silver medal in the mixed team event. In June, she won Lagos International tournament in women's doubles events.

In 2019, she competed at the African Games, won a mixed team gold, also two silver medals in the women's singles and doubles events.

In 2021, she competed at the 2020 Summer Olympics.

Achievements

African Games 
Women's singles

Women's doubles

African Championships 
Women's singles

Women's doubles

Mixed doubles

African Youth Games 
Girls' singles

Girls' doubles

BWF International Challenge/Series (12 titles, 5 runners-up) 
Women's singles

Women's doubles

Mixed doubles

  BWF International Challenge tournament
  BWF International Series tournament
  BWF Future Series tournament

References

External links 
 

Living people
1998 births
Sportspeople from Ogun State
Nigerian female badminton players
Badminton players at the 2020 Summer Olympics
Olympic badminton players of Nigeria
Competitors at the 2019 African Games
African Games gold medalists for Nigeria
African Games silver medalists for Nigeria
African Games medalists in badminton
21st-century Nigerian women